Future Stars (formerly TAC Cup Future Stars) is an Australian sports television program which focuses on the TAC Cup, under-18 Australian rules football competitions and young prospects of the AFL. It premiered on Sunday, 10 May 2009 at 1:00pm on GTV-9 in Melbourne, and features game highlights, interviews and analysis of the top prospects to be nominated in the AFL draft.

Originally known as TAC Cup Future Stars, Future Stars was hosted by Craig Hutchison (2009-2014), whose production company, Crocmedia, is producing the show. Former  player, Ben Dixon, and AFL talent scout, Kevin Sheehan were panellists from the start, with Terry Wallace joining in 2010.

In 2009, Sport 927's Angela Pippos reported from the field.

In 2015, former Richmond and Western Bulldogs forward Nathan Brown succeeded Hutchison as host in alignment with the rebranding to its current name. A revolving special guest panellist and current AFL player usually sits on the panel to round the show.

References

Nine Network original programming
Australian rules football television series
2009 Australian television series debuts
2010s Australian television series
Television shows set in Melbourne